The Lokmanya Tilak Terminus–Ajni Express via [Hingoli- Aurangabad] is an Express train belonging to Indian Railways – Central Railway zone that runs between Lokmanya Tilak Terminus  and  in India.

It operates as train number 11202 from Ajni to Lokmanya Tilak Terminus and as train number 11201 in the reverse direction, serving the state of Maharashtra.

Coaches

The 11202 / 01 Ajni–Lokmanya Tilak Terminus Express has 1 AC 2 tier, 3 AC 3 tier, 6 Sleeper class, 6 General Unreserved & 2 SLR (Seating cum Luggage Rake) coaches. It does not carry a pantry car.

As is customary with most train services in India, coach composition may be amended at the discretion of Indian Railways depending on demand.

Rake sharing

The 11202 / 01 Ajni–Lokmanya Tilak Terminus Express has a rake sharing arrangement with 11205 / 06 Lokmanya Tilak Terminus–Karimnagar Express.

Service

Route & Halts 

The important halts of the train are:

 
 
 
 
 
Rotegaon
Lasur
 
  
Partur 
Selu 
 
Purna Junction
Basmat
Hingoli Deccan
Washim

Direction reversal

The train reverses its direction 1 times:

Traction

Despite electrification of almost 41% of the route, a Diesel Loco Shed, Kalyan-based WDM-3D or WDP-4D locomotive powers the train for its entire journey.

Timings

11202 Ajni–Lokmanya Tilak Terminus Express leaves Ajni every Friday at 16:15 hrs IST and reaches Lokmanya Tilak Terminus at 13:55 hrs IST the next day.
11201 Lokmanya Tilak Terminus–Ajni Express leaves Lokmanya Tilak Terminus every Monday at 15:50 hrs IST and reaches Ajni at 14:15 hrs IST the next day.

References 

 
 http://www.newindianexpress.com/cities/hyderabad/Nizamabad-Mumbai-new-train-from-November-3/2013/10/29/article1861577.ece
 https://www.flickr.com/photos/48244096@N03/10555865296/
 http://freepressjournal.in/fpjgallery/picture.php?/1726
 https://www.panoramio.com/photo/103467325

External links

Express trains in India
Rail transport in Maharashtra
Transport in Mumbai
Transport in Nagpur
Railway services introduced in 2010